Sean David Corkery (born 6 November 1972 in Cork, Ireland) is a retired Irish rugby union player.
In his career (playing at blind-side wing-forward) he played for Cork Constitution, Munster and Bristol, as well as winning 27 caps for Ireland between 1994 and 1999.

References

External links
Munster Profile

1972 births
Living people
Irish rugby union players
Ireland international rugby union players
Cork Constitution players
Munster Rugby players
Sundays Well RFC players
Rugby union players from County Cork